This is a timeline of the presence of Eastern Orthodoxy in Greece from 1204 to 1453. The history of Greece traditionally encompasses the study of the Greek people, the areas they ruled historically, as well as the territory now composing the modern state of Greece.

Latin occupation and end of Byzantium (1204–1453) 

1204 Fourth Crusade sacks Constantinople, laying waste to the city and stealing many relics and other items; the Great Schism is generally regarded as having been completed by this act; Venetians use the imperial monastery of Christ Pantocrator as their headquarters in Constantinople.
1204 Latin Occupation of mainland Greece under Franks and Venetians begins: the Latin Empire of Constantinople, Latin Kingdom of Thessalonica, the Principality of Achaea, and the Duchy of Athens; the Venetians controlled the Duchy of the Archipelago in the Aegean; Othon de la Roche of Burgundy becomes Duke of Athens.
1205 Latins annex Athens and convert the Parthenon into a Roman Catholic church – Santa Maria di Athene, later Notre Dame d'Athene.
1211 Venetian crusaders conquer Byzantine Crete, retaining it until defeated by the Ottomans in 1669.

1224 The Byzantines recover Thessaloniki and surrounding area, under the Greek ruler of Epirus Theodore Komnenos Doukas.
1231 Burning of 13 monk-martyrs and Confessors of the Monastery of Panagia of Kantara, on Cyprus, defenders of leavened bread in the Eucharist, who suffered under the Latins.
1234 Delegates of the two churches met first at Nicaea and then at Nymphaion (Asia Minor), negotiating the issues related to the union of the Churches, including dogmatic issues, however the dialogue came to a dead end.
1235 Venerable saints Olympiada, abbess, and nun Euphrosyne martyred by pirates on Lesbos.
1236 On the occasion of a joint Byzantine-Bulgarian siege of Latin Constantinople, Pope Gregory IX issued a crusading bull authorizing a crusade against the Byzantines under Emperor John Vatatzes.
c. 1238-63 Construction of the Church of Hagia Sophia in Trabzon, capital of the Empire of Trebizond, regarded as one of the finest examples of Byzantine architecture.
1243 Decisive Mongol victory over the Seljuk Sultanate of Rum (with capital at Iconium), at the Battle of Köse Dağ.
1249 Mystras citadel built by Franks in the Peloponnese.
1258 Michael VIII Palaiologos seizes the throne of the Nicaean Empire, founding the last Roman (Byzantine) dynasty, beginning reconquest of Greek peninsula from Latins.
1259 Byzantines defeat Latin Principality of Achaea at the Battle of Pelagonia, marking the beginning of the Byzantine recovery of Greece.
1261 End of Latin occupation of Constantinople and restoration of Orthodox patriarchs; Emperor Michael VIII Palaiologos makes Mystras seat of the new Despotate of Morea, where a Byzantine renaissance occurred.

1265–1310 Arsenite Schism of Constantinople, beginning when Patr. Arsenius Autorianus excommunicated emperor Michael VIII Palaiologos.
1274 Orthodox clergy attending the Second Council of Lyon, accept supremacy of Rome and filioque clause.
1275 Unionist Patr. of Constantinople John XI Beccus elected to replace Patr. Joseph I Galesiotes, who opposed Council of Lyon; Persecution of Athonite monks by Emp. Michael VIII and Patr. John XI Beccus.
c. 1276–80 Venerable monk-martyrs of Iviron Monastery, martyred by the Latins.
1279 Hieromonk Ieronymos Agathangelos writes an Apocalypse dealing with the destinies of the nations.
1281 Pope Martin IV authorizes a Crusade against the newly re-established Byzantine Empire in Constantinople, excommunicating Emperor Michael VIII Palaiologos and the Greeks and renouncing the union of 1274; French and Venetian expeditions set out toward Constantinople but are forced to turn back in the following year due to the Sicilian Vespers.
1282 Death of 26 martyrs of Zografou monastery on Mount Athos, martyred by the Latins.
1285 Death of venerable martyrs Abbot Euthymius and twelve monks of Vatopedi, who suffered martyrdom for denouncing the Latinizing rulers Michael Paleologos (1261–1281) and John Bekkos (1275–1282) as heretics; Council of Blachernae, convened and presided over by Ecumenical Patriarch Gregory II the Cypriot, condemns the actions of the eastern delegation at the false council of Lyons (1274) and also condemns the Franko-Latins who use of the filioque clause, thus officially repudiating the accommodation with Rome.
1287 Last record of Western Rite Monastery of Amalfion (Monastery of Saint Mary of the Latins) on Mount Athos.
1292 The monastery of St. Nicholas is founded on Ioannina Island by Michael Philanthropinos (who had served as the Metropolitan of Ioannina), being oldest of five Greek Orthodox monasteries established there between the 13th and 17th centuries.
14th century "Golden Age" of Thessaloniki in both literature and art, many churches and monasteries built.

1300–1400 The "Chronicle of Morea" (Το χρονικό του Μορέως) narrates events of the establishment of feudalism in mainland Greece, mainly in the Morea/Peloponnese, by the Franks following the Fourth Crusade, covering a period from 1204 to 1292.
1309 Rhodes falls to the Knights of St. John, who establish their headquarters there, renaming themselves the "Knights of Rhodes".
1310 Arsenite Schism of Constantinople is officially ended by the reconciliation of the Arsenites to the Josephites, in a dramatic ceremony at Hagia Sophia on 14 Sep 1310.
1311 Battle of Kephissos: Athens was conquered by the Catalan Company, a band of mercenaries called Almogavars, who made Catalan the official language and replaced the French and Byzantine-derived laws of the Principality of Achaea with the laws of Catalonia.

1314 Foundation of the Monastery of the Nativity of the Theotokos in Kleisoura, Kastoria.
c. 1320 Death of Righteous Gerasimos, Ascetic of Euboea, Orthodox missionary in Greece in the period of the Frankokratia.
1321-28 Byzantine civil war.
1326 The city of Prussa in Asia Minor falls to the Ottomans after a nine-year siege.
c. 1326–1330 The Ottoman Janissary corps is first created by Sultan Orhan I, under the patronage of the Sufi Mystic Haji Bektas, converting many to Islam.
1329 Greek monk and wonderworker St. Sergius of Valaam co-founded the Valaam Monastery (along with Herman of Valaam), in Russian Karelia on Valaam island, and is credited with bringing Orthodox Christianity to the Karelian and Finnish people.
1331 The city of Nicaea, capital of the Empire only 100 years previously, falls to the Ottomans.
1336 Meteora in Greece are established as a center of Orthodox monasticism, with the founding of the Great Meteoron Monastery.
1337 Nicomedia captured by Ottomans.
1338 Gregory Palamas writes Triads in defense of the Holy Hesychasts, defending the Orthodox practice of hesychast spirituality and the use of the Jesus Prayer.
1341–47 Byzantine Civil war between John VI Cantacuzenus (1347–54) and John V Palaeologus (1341–91), sometimes referred to as the Second Palaiologan Civil War.
1341–51 Six patriarchal sessions of the Ninth Ecumenical Council held in Constantinople, convened by Roman Emperor Andronikos III Palaiologos, presided over by Ecumenical Patriarch John Kalekas and attended by the Patriarchs of Alexandria, Antioch and Jerusalem, and several bishops and abbots, including St. Gregory Palamas, through which the Orthodox Church affirmed the hesychastic theology of Gregory Palamas and condemned rationalistic philosophy of Barlaam of Calabria and the Akindynite heresy.
1345 Byzantine jurist Constantine Harmenopoulos compiles the Hexabiblos in six volumes from a wide range of Byzantine legal sources.
1346 Council of Adrianople, convened and presided over by Patriarch Lazarus of Jerusalem, and attended by several Thracian bishops, deposes Ecumenical Patriarch John Kalekas for supporting and ordaining the condemned heretic, Gregory Akindynos.
c. 1351 Holy Royal Patriarchal Stavropegic Monastery of the Vlatades (Moni Vlatadon) is founded in Thessaloniki.
1354 Byzantine Mesazon and theologian Demetrios Kydones, a Thomist, or Latinizer, translated the Summa contra Gentiles of Thomas Aquinas into Greek; Ottomans make first settlement in Europe at Gallipoli.
1359 Death of Gregory Palamas the Wonderworker, Abp. of Thessaloniki; the first Greek Metropolitan is appointed in Wallachia, and between 1381-1386 in Moldavia.

1360 Death of Venerable Saint John Kukuzelis the Hymnographer.
c. 1361–1365 Ottoman Sultan Murad I formalized the famous corps of Janissaries by exacting a tribute ("child levy" – Devşirme) in children from Orthodox Christian subjects in the Balkans, conscripting the flower of Orthodox Christendom before adolescence, converting them to Islam and raising them to become Muslim soldiers and administrators.
1362 Adrianople fell to the Ottomans and served as the forward base for Ottoman expansion into Europe.
1374 Dionysius the Hagiorite (Denys de Korisos) obtains a Chrysobull from Alexios III Comnenus, Emperor of Trebizond, founding the Monastery of Dionysiou.
1383 The Ottoman Turks seize Mount Athos.
1386-7 Church of St Athanasius of Mouzaki built in Kastoria, Greece.
1390 Ottomans take Philadelphia, last significant Byzantine enclave in Anatolia.
c. 1391–1394 In a Dialogue with a Learned Moslem, Byzantine emperor Manuel II Paleologus commented on such issues as forced conversion, holy war, and the relationship between faith and reason.}}
1392 Death of Nicholas Kabasilas, well known theological writer and mystic of the Orthodox Church who took the side of the monks of Mount Athos and St Gregory Palamas in the Hesychast controversy.
1394–1402 Ottomans unsuccessfully besiege and blockade Constantinople for the first time.
 15th century By the 15th century, only 17 metropolitanates, 1 archbishopric, and 3 bishoprics survived in Anatolia (Asia Minor), an area that had at one time possessed over 50 metropolitanates and more than 400 bishoprics.
1403 After the Turks are defeated at the Battle of Ankara (1402), Mount Athos is restored to Byzantine sovereignty.
1406 Manuel II Palaeologus issues the third Typikon of Mount Athos.
1411 Death of Niphon of Mount Athos, proponent of hesychastic theology and wonderworker.
1416 Ottoman fleet is destroyed by Venetians at Gallipoli.
1422 Second unsuccessful Ottoman siege of Constantinople.
1423-30 Thessaloniki was under Venetian control.
1424 A delegation of Athonite monks visits Sultan Murad II, in Adrianople.
1426 Death of New Martyr Ephraim of Nea Makri, a saint "newly revealed" ("νεοφανείς") in 1950.
1429 Death of Symeon of Thessaloniki, Archbishop of Thessaloniki.
1430 Ottomans final capture of Thessaloniki; the monks of Mount Athos submit to Sultan Murad II and keep their autonomy.
1438 Ottoman Sultan Murad II officially codified the Devşirme system of levying taxes in the form of Christian youths from the empire, involving enforced conversion to Islam.
1439 Saint Mark of Ephesus courageously defended Orthodoxy at the Council of Florence, being the only Eastern bishop to refuse to sign the decrees of the council, regarded as a "Pillar of Orthodoxy" by the Church; Council of Florence unsuccessfully tries to unite the Greek East and Latin West.
1443 Council of Jerusalem, attended by the Orthodox Patriarchs of Alexandria, Antioch and Jerusalem condemned the union that was pronounced at the Council of Florence and threatened to excommunicate the Emperor and all who adhered to it, denouncing Metrophanes II of Constantinople as a heretic, and cancelling his Ordinations.
1448 Council of Russian hierarchs in Moscow elects Jonah of Riazan as Metropolitan of Kiev and all Russia, being the first independent Metropolitan of Moscow and all Rus', having been appointed without the approval of the Patriarch in Constantinople as was the norm.
1450 Death of Empress Helena Palaeologina (Saint Ypomoni of Loutraki); Council of Constantinople convoked by Emperor Constantine XI Palaiologos declined to accept the resolutions passed by the Council of Florence which were in favor of the union of the Greek and Latin churches.
1452 Unification of Roman Catholic and Greek Orthodox Churches in the cathedral of Hagia Sophia on 12 December, five months before the city fell, on the West's terms, when Emperor Constantine XI Palaiologos, under pressure from Rome, allowed the union to be proclaimed by the former Metropolitan of Kiev Isidore, who had participated in the Council of Florence and was now a cardinal in the Roman Catholic Church, and who read the solemn promulgation of union and celebrated the union liturgy, including the name of the pope, arousing the greatest agitation among the population of the city; death of Greek Byzantine philosopher and Renaissance humanist scholar George Plethon Gemistos (1353-1452), teacher of Basilios Bessarion, and one of the most challenging representatives of Greek learning who openly attempted to upset the balance between Greek thought and Christian dogma by advocating for the creation of a new religion based on Neoplatonism. 
1453 Constantinople falls to the Ottomans, ending Roman Empire; on the eve of the fall of the city the last Megas Doux of the Byzantine Empire Loukas Notaras remarked: "better the turban of the Turk than the tiara of the Latin [pope];" Hagia Sophia turned into a mosque;  martyrdom of Constantine XI Palaiologos, last of the Byzantine Emperors; of the 100,000 inhabitants of Constantinople, about 40,000 are supposed to have perished in the siege, and the Greek aristocracy was either then or immediately afterwards annihilated; many Greek scholars escape to the West with books that become translated into Latin, triggering the Renaissance; beginning of the genre of lamentation folk songs known as "Moirologia", or dirges (Byzantine secular music).

See also

Eastern Orthodoxy in Greece
List of archbishops of Athens
Greek Orthodox Church
Eastern Orthodox Church organization
History
History of the Eastern Orthodox Church
History of Eastern Christianity
History of the Eastern Orthodox Church under the Ottoman Empire
History of Eastern Orthodox Churches in the 20th century
Timeline of Eastern Orthodoxy in America
Church Fathers
Apostolic Fathers
Church Fathers
Ante-Nicene Fathers (book)
Desert Fathers
Nicene and Post-Nicene Fathers
List of Church Fathers

Notes

References

Bibliography
 Aristeides Papadakis (with John Meyendorff). The Christian East and the Rise of the Papacy: The Church 1071–1453 A.D. The Church in History Vol. IV. Crestwood, N.Y. : St. Vladimirs Seminary Press, 1994.
 Deno John Geanakoplos. Byzantine East and Latin West: Two worlds of Christendom in Middle Ages and Renaissance: Studies in Ecclesiastical and Cultural History. Oxford Blackwell 1966.
 E. Brown. "The Cistercians in the Latin Empire of Constantinople and Greece." Traditio 14 (1958), pp. 63–120.
 Gill Page. Being Byzantine: Greek Identity before the Ottomans, 1200–1420. Cambridge University Press, 2008. 
 Joseph Gill. Church Union: Rome and Byzantium, 1204–1453. Variorum Reprints, 1979.
 Kenneth M. Setton. Catalan Domination of Athens, 1311–1388. Mediaeval Academy of America, 1948.
 Kenneth Meyer Setton. The Papacy and the Levant, 1204–1571: The Thirteenth and fourteenth centuries, Volume 1. American Philosophical Society, 1976.
 N.G. Chrissis. Crusading in Frankish Greece: A Study of Byzantine-Western Relations and Attitudes, 1204-1282. Medieval Church Studies (MCS 22). Brepols Publishers, 2013. 338 pp. 
 P. Charanis. "Byzantium, the West and the Origin of the First Crusade." Byzantion 19 (1949), pp. 17–36.
 Prof. Tia M. Kolbaba. The Byzantine Lists: Errors of the Latins. 1st Ed. Urbana and Chicago: University of Illinois Press, 2000. 248pp.
 R. Wolff. "The Organisation of the Latin Patriarchate of Constantinople 1204–61." Traditio 6 (1948), pp. 33–60.
 Speros Vryonis, (Jr). "Byzantine Attitudes towards Islam during the Late Middle Ages." Greek Roman and Byzantine Studies 12 (1971).
 Stephanos Efthymiadis, (Open University of Cyprus, Ed.). The Ashgate Research Companion to Byzantine Hagiography: Volume I: Periods and Places. Ashgate Publishing, Ltd., December 2011. 464 pp.  
 Stephanos Efthymiadis, (Open University of Cyprus, Ed.). The Ashgate Research Companion to Byzantine Hagiography: Volume II: Genres and Contexts. Ashgate Publishing, Ltd., March 2014. 536 pp.  
 William Miller. The Latins in the Levant: A History of Frankish Greece 1204–1566. Cambridge, Speculum Historiale, 1908.

Cultural history of Greece
Frankokratia
Greek Orthodoxy in Greece
Orthodoxy in Greece
 
Orthodox Church